Middle Grove is an unincorporated community in Monroe County, Missouri, United States.

Demographics

History
The community was settled in 1830, and founded by John C. Milligan and Jacob Whittenburg. The community was named due to its location in the center of a rural district. A post office called Middle Grove was established in 1835, the name was changed to Middlegrove in 1894, and the post office closed in 1907.

In 1942, heavy rains hit the community, forcing residents onto rooftops to await help.

In 1979, Melvin Lute was stabbed and shot in his Middle Grove trailer home.  His wife Shirley and son Roy were charged with the murder.

Notable people
Oak Hunter (1877-1958), member of Missouri House of Representatives, and speaker of the house.
Xenophon Overton Pindall (1873-1935), member of Arkansas House of Representatives and Arkansas State Senate; Acting Governor of Arkansas.

References

External links
 Middle Grove School District

Unincorporated communities in Monroe County, Missouri
Unincorporated communities in Missouri